Sir Kevin Joseph Satchwell (born 6 March 1951) is a British educator who is headmaster of Thomas Telford School in Shropshire.

Satchwell was born in Wednesbury, Staffordshire, the son of Joseph and Pauline Satchwell. He was educated at Wodensborough High School, Wednesbury Boys' High School, Shoreditch College of Technology and the Open University.

He spent 15 years teaching in Liverpool and four years as headteacher in Wolverhampton, but it is his stewardship of Thomas Telford School over the past 25 years that has put him in the spotlight. The City Technology College became the first non-selective state school in which all the GCSE/GNVQ candidates got top grades. The school garnered headlines again by selling its online information technology course to other schools, earning more than enough money to put £1m into the formation of one of the new city academies.

He was knighted in 2001. In July 2010, Satchwell received an honorary doctorate from Staffordshire University.

Personal life
In 1975, Satchwell married Maria Bernadette Grimes, the Headteacher of Madeley Academy; the couple have a son and a daughter.

References

1951 births
Living people
Knights Bachelor
People from Wednesbury
People from Wolverhampton
Heads of schools in England